Estadio Mundialista Luciana Aymar is a field hockey stadium in Rosario, Argentina. It was specifically built to host the 2010 Women's Hockey World Cup, with a capacity of 12,000 with mobile grandstands. The stadium changed its name in 2015 to honor Luciana Aymar, widely regarded as the best Argentine femmale hockey player ever.

After it was announced the stadium would be the venue for the 2012 Women's Hockey Champions Trophy, a permanent grandstand was built on one of the sides of the pitch with 1,400 seats plus the mobile grandstands as previously erected for the World Cup for a total capacity of 6,200.

This stadium was chosen one more time to host the Final of the 2014–15 FIH Hockey World League. Before the final match started, it was officially confirmed by the municipal authorities the name change in honor of Aymar with the unveiling of a plaque.

International events
 2010 Women's Hockey World Cup
 2012 Women's Hockey Champions Trophy
 2014–15 Women's FIH Hockey World League Final
 3 matches of 2019 Women's FIH Pro League's round-robin (against ,  and )
 3 matches of 2019 Men's FIH Pro League's round-robin (against ,  and )

References

External links
 Stadium info at estadiosdeargentina.com.ar 
 Stadium information a World Stadiums 

Field hockey venues in Argentina
2010 establishments in Argentina